Volhynian Voivodeship or Wołyń Voivodeship may refer to:
Volhynian Voivodeship (1569–1795)

Wołyń Voivodeship (1921–1939)